The 2022–23 Saint Joseph's Hawks basketball team represented Saint Joseph's University during the 2022–23 NCAA Division I men's basketball season. The Hawks, led by fourth-year head coach Billy Lange, played their home games at Hagan Arena in Philadelphia, Pennsylvania as members of the Atlantic 10 Conference.

Previous season 
The Hawks finished the 2021–22 season 11–19, 5–13 in A-10 play to finish 13th place. They lost in the first round of the A-10 Tournament to La Salle.

Offseason

Departures

Incoming Transfers

Recruiting classes

2022 recruiting class

2023 recruiting class

Roster

Schedule and results

|-
!colspan=12 style=| Exhibition

|-
!colspan=12 style=| Non-conference regular season

|-
!colspan=12 style=| Atlantic 10 regular season

|-
!colspan=12 style=| A-10 tournament

References 

Saint Joseph's Hawks men's basketball seasons
Saint Joseph's
Saint Joseph's
Saint Joseph's